Ernst Fischer (3 July 1899 – 31 July 1972), also known under the pseudonyms Ernst Peter Fischer, Peter Wieden, Pierre Vidal, and Der Miesmacher, was a Bohemian-born Austrian journalist, writer and politician.

Biography 
Ernst Fischer was born in Komotau, Bohemia, in 1899 as the son of the Imperial and Royal colonel and teacher of mathematics and descriptive geometry at military schools Josef Fischer and his wife Agnes. He served on the Italian Front in the First World War, studied philosophy in Graz and did unskilled labour in a factory before working as a provincial journalist and then on the Arbeiter-Zeitung from 1927. In 1932, he married Ruth von Mayenburg. Initially a social democrat, Fischer became a member of the Communist Party of Austria (Kommunistische Partei Österreichs or KPÖ) member in 1934 after being disillusioned in liberal democracy for not being able to withstand fascism.

In 1934, after Fischer and his wife were involved in the Austrian Civil War, they had to leave Austria. They went to Czechoslovakia, where he began working for the Comintern as an editor. In 1938, they went to Moscow, where Fischer continued to work for the Comintern. They lived at Hotel Lux, a luxury hotel that had been built in 1911, and was taken over by the Communist Party after the October Revolution. Following Adolf Hitler's seizure of power, the hotel became a refuge for communist exiles, especially Germans. The Fischers lived there from 1938 until 1945.

When Fischer and his wife arrived at Hotel Lux, the Stalinist purges were still taking place and the exiles living at the hotel were living in a climate of fear and terror. The autumn after their arrival, Fischer came home from work one evening, looking terrified. Gustl Deutsch, an Austrian who had been arrested and had imprisoned, had managed to smuggle him a note to alert him to the danger facing Fischer. Under torture, Deutsch had named Fischer as being involved in a plot against Stalin's life. Although the charges were completely false, by being accused, Fischer was in grave danger and he immediately sought help from Georgi Dimitrov, one of the leaders of the Comintern. Dimitrov replied, "I will be able to save you, but the others...?"

After the war, Fischer remained an important figure in the KPÖ until 1969. He served as Communist minister of information in the first post-war government of Renner (27 April 1945 – 20 December 1945). He published articles in Weg und Ziel, monthly journal of the KPÖ. 

Fischer and his wife were divorced in 1954.

His book, Erinnerungen und Reflexionen ("Memories and Reflections"), was released around the same time his ex-wife's book came out, Blaues Blut und rote Fahnen. Revolutionäres Frauenleben zwischen Wien, Berlin und Moskau ("Blue Blood and Red Flags. Revolutionary Female Life Between Vienna, Berlin and Moscow"). The two books covered the same period.

Fischer is particularly famous in the West for his book The Necessity of Art (1959). In this Fischer took many of the commonplace concepts of Marxist artistic theory up to that  point - art as labor, collective vs individual, formalism and socialist realism - and develops them in a wide-ranging essay on the history of art from magic and religion to the Romantics, critical realism and art in the service of building socialism (critically) not just state propaganda.

The book has influenced many writers since the late 1950s, in particular Kenneth Tynan and John Berger. John Berger wrote a new introduction to the recent Verso Books edition.

Fischer died on 31 July 1972 in Deutschfeistritz.

Literary works 
 Krise der Jugend. 1931
 Freiheit und Diktatur. 1934
 Die Entstehung des österreichischen Volkscharakters. 1944
 Franz Grillparzer. 1948
 Roman in Dialogen. 1955 (with Louise Eisler)
 Von der Notwendigkeit der Kunst. 1959 (English translation: The Necessity of Art. 1963)
 Kunst und Koexistenz: Beitrag zu einer modernen marxistischen Ästhetik. 1967
 Was Marx wirklich sagte. 1968 (translated as How to Read Marx)
 Erinnerungen und Reflexionen. 1969 
 Das Ende einer Illusion. 1973
 Von Grillparzer zu Kafka. 1975
 Born in Austria

References

External links

 Seite zu Ernst Fischer der Österreichischen Nationalbibliothek
 
 

1899 births
1972 deaths
Austrian male writers
Communist Party of Austria politicians
Government ministers of Austria
People from Chomutov
Austrian communists
People granted political asylum in the Soviet Union
20th-century Austrian journalists
Austrian newspaper editors
Austrian people of German Bohemian descent
Austrian Marxist writers